Sirone is a comune (municipality) in the Province of Lecco in the Italian region Lombardy, located about  northeast of Milan and about  southwest of Lecco.

The municipality of Sirone contains the frazione (subdivision) San Benedetto.

Sirone borders the following municipalities: Barzago, Dolzago, Garbagnate Monastero, Molteno, Oggiono.

Demographic evolution

References

External links
 www.comune.sirone.lc.it

Cities and towns in Lombardy